New Britain as a historical term of limited usage referred in its day to the poorly mapped lands of North America north of 17th-century New France. The name applied primarily to today's Nunavik and Labrador interiors, though in the 18th century this had grown to include all of the mainland shores of Hudson Bay and James Bay north of the Canadas. British visitors came to sub-divide the district loosely into the territories of New South Wales, New North Wales and Labrador. The name Labrador predates mention of the other names by more than a century.

Early exploration
In 1612 Welsh captain Thomas Button wintered on the shores of Hudson Bay, at the mouth of the river he named the Nelson. He dubbed his encampment Port Nelson, and "the whole of the western shore New Wales." Seven years later, in 1619, Danish captain Jens Munk would winter nearby at the mouth of the Churchill River, naming those environs Nova Dania (Latin for "New Denmark").

The region would again be visited twelve years later in 1631 by Captains Thomas James and Luke Foxe. Supposedly Captain Foxe, upon discovering a cross erected by Button at Port Nelson, christened the shore north of the Nelson River as New North Wales, and all the lands south as New South Wales. Another account attributes the event to Captain James, while crediting Foxe with having bestowed upon the region the since-forgotten label of New Yorkshire.
 
 New North Wales – Mainland Kivalliq in Nunavut, and the Northern Region in Manitoba south to Port Nelson.
 New South Wales – Northern Manitoba south from Port Nelson to James Bay, including the Kenora District in Ontario.
 Labrador – The eastern coast of Hudson Bay, including Nord-du-Québec in Québec and modern Labrador in Newfoundland and Labrador. During the "New Britain" era the only European settlements in Labrador were the Moravian Church missions at Nain (1771), Okak (1776), and Hopedale (1782).

139 years later Captain James Cook would more successfully use the name New South Wales for the Colony of New South Wales which would eventually encompass most of New Holland (Australia). By this time the North American name had begun to fall into obscurity.

References

External links
Danish Arctic Explorations.
Worcester, Joseph Emerson. Elements of Geography, Ancient and Modern, with an Atlas.
Carte du Canada ou la nouvelle France. 
The political state of the British empire, containing a general view of the domestic and foreign possessions of the crown, the laws, commerce, revenues, offices and other establishments, civil and military. Adolphus, John. Cadell, 1818. p640.
The American Universal Geography: Or, A View of the Present State of All the Kingdoms, States and Colonies in the Known World. Morse, Jedidiah & Aaron Arrowsmith, Samuel Lewis et al. S. Etheridge, 1819. p166.
The North-American and the West-Indian gazetteer. 1778. p
The Modern Part of an Universal History: From the Earliest Account of Time. Compiled from Original Writers. By the Authors of The Antient Part. S. Richardson et al. 1764.
The Search for the Western Sea: The Story of the Exploration of North-Western America. Burpee, Lawrence J. Musson Book Co: Toronto., 1908.
Atlas manuale, or, A new sett of maps of all the parts of the earth, as well Asia, Africa and America, as Europe. Moll, Herman. London: 1709.

New South Wales
Archaic English words and phrases
English exonyms
Names of places in Canada
17th-century neologisms